The 2011 Suruga Bank Championship was the fourth edition of the Suruga Bank Championship, the club football match co-organized by the Japan Football Association, the football governing body of Japan, and CONMEBOL, the football governing body of South America, between the winners of the previous season's J. League Cup and Copa Sudamericana. It was contested by Japanese club Júbilo Iwata, the 2010 J. League Cup champion, and Argentine club Independiente, the 2010 Copa Sudamericana champion.

Júbilo Iwata won 4–2 in penalty shootout, after drawing 2–2 in the ninety minutes of play.

Qualified teams

Rules
The Suruga Bank Championship is played over one match, hosted by the winner of the J. League Cup. If the score is tied at the end of regulation, the winner is determined by a penalty shootout (no extra time is played). A maximum of seven substitutions may be made during the match.

Match details

References

External links
Official webpage, J. League 
Official webpage, CONMEBOL 

2011 in South American football
2011
2011 in Japanese football
Club Atlético Independiente matches
Júbilo Iwata matches
Association football penalty shoot-outs